Texas v. United States may refer to:
 Texas v. United States (2016), relating to gender identity
 California v. Texas, a 2021 court case relating to the Affordable Care Act known as Texas v. United States in the lower courts
 Texas vs The Nation, a college football all-star game

See also 
 United States v. Texas (disambiguation)